Waccamaw Regional Transportation Authority (or Coast RTA, formerly both Waccamaw RTA and Lymo) is a public bus service along the Grand Strand in Horry County, South Carolina. It is based out of Conway, South Carolina and services an area from North Myrtle Beach to Georgetown.

Fixed Routes
1 Conway 
7 Conway/Myrtle Beach
10 Myrtle Beach Connector
16x Georgetown Express
16 Georgetown/Myrtle Beach
15N Ocean Blvd North
15S Ocean Blvd South

Paratransit
Coast RTA Paratransit service is a fully coordinated human service system, including demand response and subscription services. Paratransit service is for seniors (over 60) and individuals with disabilities or conditions that prevent them from using the Coast RTA fixed route system.

External links
Waccamaw Regional Transportation Authority

Bus transportation in South Carolina
Transportation in Horry County, South Carolina